Andrew Laing (born 9 August 1963, in Edinburgh) was HM Chief Inspector of Constabulary for Scotland from 2010 to 2013.

He was educated at Portobello High School and Edinburgh Napier University. He was with the Lothian and Borders Police from 1982 to 2004; and the Fife Constabulary from 2004 to 2010, finishing with the rank of Deputy Chief Constable. After his time as Chief Inspector of Constabulary he was Director of the Scottish Business Resilience Centre from 2011 to 2015.

Notes

People from Edinburgh
Officers in Scottish police forces
Scottish police officers
Chief Inspectors of Constabulary (Scotland)
Law enforcement in Scotland
1963 births
Living people
People educated at Portobello High School
Alumni of Edinburgh Napier University